Michael Govan (born 1963) is the director of the Los Angeles County Museum of Art. Prior to his current position, Govan worked as the director of the Dia Art Foundation in New York City.

Early life and education
Govan was born in 1963 in North Adams, Massachusetts, and was raised in the Washington D.C. area, attending Sidwell Friends School.

He majored in art history and fine arts at Williams College, where he met Thomas Krens, who was then director of the Williams College Museum of Art. Govan became closely involved with the museum, serving as acting curator as an undergraduate. After receiving his B.A. from Williams in 1985, Govan began an MFA in fine arts from the University of California, San Diego.

Career
As a twenty-five year old graduate student, Govan was recruited by his former mentor at Williams, Thomas Krens, who in 1988 had been appointed director of the Solomon R. Guggenheim Foundation. Govan served as deputy director of the Solomon R. Guggenheim Museum under Krens from 1988 to 1994, a period that culminated in the construction and opening of the Frank Gehry designed Guggenheim branch in Bilbao, Spain. Govan supervised the reinstallation of the museum's permanent collection galleries after its extensive renovation.

Dia Art Foundation 

From 1994 to 2006, Govan was president and director of Dia Art Foundation in New York City. There, he spearheaded the conversion of a Nabisco box factory into the 300,000 square foot Dia:Beacon in New York's Hudson Valley, which houses Dia's collection of art from the 1960s to the present. Built in a former Nabisco box factory, the critically acclaimed museum has been credited with catalyzing a cultural and economic revival within the formerly factory-based city of Beacon. Dia's collection nearly doubled in size during Govan's tenure, but he also came under criticism for "needlessly and permanently" closing Dia's West 22nd Street building. During his time at Dia, Govan also worked closely with artists James Turrell and Michael Heizer, becoming an ardent supporter of Roden Crater and City, the artists' respective site-specific land art projects under construction in the American southwest. Govan successfully lobbied Washington to have the 704,000 acres in central Nevada surrounding City declared a national monument in 2015.

LACMA 

In February 2006, a search committee composed of eleven LACMA trustees, led by the late Nancy M. Daly, recruited Govan to run the Los Angeles County Museum of Art. Govan has stated that he was drawn to the role not only because of LACMA's geographical distance from its European and east coast peers, but also because of the museum's relative youth, having been established in 1961. "I felt that because of this newness I had the opportunity to reconsider the museum," Govan has written, "[and] Los Angeles is a good place to do that."

Govan has been widely regarded for transforming LACMA into both a local and international landmark. Since Govan's arrival, LACMA has acquired by donation or purchase over 27,000 works for the permanent collection, and the museum's gallery space has almost doubled thanks to the addition of two new buildings designed by Renzo Piano, the Broad Contemporary Art Museum (BCAM) and the Lynda and Stewart Resnick Pavilion. LACMA's annual attendance has grown from 600,000 to nearly 1.6 million in 2016.

Artist collaborations 

Since his arrival, Govan has commissioned exhibition scenography and gallery designs in collaboration with artists. In 2006, for example, Govan invited LA artist John Baldessari to design an upcoming exhibition about the Belgian surrealist René Magritte, resulting in a theatrical show that reflected the twisted perspective of the latter's topsy-turvy world. Baldessari has also designed LACMA's logo. Since then, Govan has also commissioned Cuban-American artist Jorge Pardo to design LACMA's Art of the Ancient Americas gallery, described in the Los Angeles Times as a "gritty cavern deep inside the earth ... crossed with a high-style urban lounge."

Govan has also commissioned several large-scale public artworks for LACMA's campus from contemporary California artists. These include Chris Burden's Urban Light (2008), a series of 202 vintage street lamps from different neighborhoods in Los Angeles, arranged in front of the entrance pavilion, Barbara Kruger's Untitled (Shafted) (2008), Robert Irwin's Primal Palm Garden (2010), and Michael Heizer's Levitated Mass, a 340-ton boulder transported 100 miles from the Jurupa Valley to LACMA, a widely publicized journey that culminated with a large celebration on Wilshire Boulevard. Thanks in part to the popularity of these public artworks, LACMA was ranked the fourth most instagrammed museum in the world in 2016.

In his first three full years, the museum raised $251 million—about $100 million more than it collected during the three years before he arrived. In 2010, it was announced that Govan will steer LACMA for at least six more years. In a letter dated February 24, 2013, Govan, along with the LACMA board's co-chairmen Terry Semel and Andrew Gordon, proposed a merger with the financially troubled Museum of Contemporary Art, Los Angeles and a plan to raise $100 million for the combined museum.

Zumthor Project 

Govan's latest project is an ambitious building project, the replacement of four of the campus's aging buildings with a single new state of the art gallery building designed by architect Peter Zumthor. As of January 2017, he has raised about $300 million in commitments. Construction is expected to begin in 2018, and the new building will open in 2023, to coincide with the opening of the new Purple Line metro stop on Wilshire Boulevard. The project also envisages dissolving all existing curatorial departments and departmental collections. Some commentators have been highly critical of Govan's plans. Joseph Giovannini, recalling Govan's technically unrealizable onetime plan to hang Jeff Koons' Train sculpture from the facade of the Ahmanson Gallery, has accused Govan of "driving the institution over a cliff into an equivalent mid-air wreck of its own". Describing the collection merging proposal as the creation of a "giant raffle bowl of some 130,000 objects", Giovannini also points out that the Zumthor building will contain 33% less gallery space than the galleries it will replace, and that the linear footage of wall space available for displays will decrease by about 7,500 ft, or 1.5 miles. Faced with losing a building named in its honor, and anticipating that its acquisitions could no longer be displayed, the Ahmanson Foundation withdrew its support.
On the merging of the separate curatorial divisions to create a non-departmental art museum, Christopher Knight has pointed out that "no other museum of LACMA's size and complexity does it" that way, and characterized the museum's 2019 "To Rome and Back" exhibition, the first to take place under the new scheme, as "bland and ineffectual" and an "unsuccessful sample of what's to come".

Personal life 

Govan is married and has two daughters, one from a previous marriage. He and his family now live in a $5.6 million house in Hancock Park provided by LACMA - a benefit worth $155,000 a year, according to most recent tax filings. He has had a private pilot's license since 1995 and keeps a 1979 Beechcraft Bonanza at Santa Monica Airport.

References

External links
 LACMA Profile

American art curators
Directors of museums in the United States
People associated with the Los Angeles County Museum of Art
Living people
University of California, San Diego alumni
Williams College alumni
Art in Greater Los Angeles
1963 births